Ram Shankar Katheria (born 21 September 1964), is an Indian politician and former Chairman of the National Commission for Scheduled Castes. He is a member of the 17th Lok Sabha of India representing Etawah constituency of Uttar Pradesh. He represented the Agra constituency of Uttar Pradesh previously. He is a member of the Bharatiya Janata Party. He was a Minister of State in the Human Resource Development Ministry till 6 July 2016.

Life
Katheria was born in Nagriya Sarawa village, Etawah, Uttar Pradesh on 21 September 1964 to Sone Lal and Shanti Devi. He spent his early years at the local Rashtriya Swayamsevak Sangh (RSS) unit, which also facilitated his education. He holds PhD from Kanpur University. He worked as a pracharak of the RSS in Agra for 13 years.

Before joining politics, he was a Professor of Hindi at the Agra University where he has taught Dalit Chetna (Dalit upliftment) and wrote several books on the subject.

On 17 February 2001, he married Mridula Katheri, with whom he has two sons and one daughter.

Political career 
Katheria was appointed as a National General-Secretary of the BJP in August 2014 and, in October, he was made in charge of the Chhattisgarh and Punjab states. However, in his November cabinet expansion, Narendra Modi inducted Katheria as a Minister of State in the Human Resource Development Ministry, where he served till 6 July 2016.

Controversies 
Katheria has been charged with forging two of his degree mark-sheets (for BA and MA) allegedly to secure a job at the Agra University. The case is being heard in an Agra court. Katheria has also listed 20 other pending cases against him in his election affidavit.

Publications
Katheria has written four books.

See also

List of members of the 15th Lok Sabha of India
Politics of India
Parliament of India
Government of India
Agra (Lok Sabha constituency)

References 

India MPs 2009–2014
Living people
1964 births
Rashtriya Swayamsevak Sangh pracharaks
Bharatiya Janata Party politicians from Uttar Pradesh
People from Etawah district
Lok Sabha members from Uttar Pradesh
Politicians from Agra
India MPs 2014–2019
India MPs 2019–present
Chhatrapati Shahu Ji Maharaj University alumni
Union ministers of state of India
Narendra Modi ministry